"What a Feeling" is a song recorded by English-Irish boy band One Direction for their fifth studio album, Made in the A.M. (2015). It was written and produced by Jamie Scott and co-written by band members Liam Payne and Louis Tomlinson along with Daniel Bryer and Mike Needle. 

The song was released as the album's second promotional single on iTunes Store and Spotify on 11 November 2015. Fans of the band held a so-called streaming party on October 25, 2020, where they all listened to the track during the whole day. The goal was to get the song on the top 100 charts. Thanks to it, the song got over 50 million streams on that day alone. 

Payne later told the fans on an Instagram live video that the song was made to be played in a stadium and it was one of his favorites from Made in the A.M. The song, along with the rest of Made in the A.M., leaked on the internet after a mishap in security during a listening party.

Reception 
While writing for Billboard, Erin Strecker described the song as having "a sweetly thumping bass line and light harmonies," and added, "the tune would feel perfectly at home in the easy, breezy '70s." In Rolling Stone's special Reader's Poll, "What a Feeling" topped #1 as one of the best songs One Direction ever released.

Charts

References 

One Direction songs
2015 singles
Syco Music singles
2015 songs
Songs written by Liam Payne
Songs written by Louis Tomlinson
Songs written by Jamie Scott
Songs written by Dan Bryer
Songs written by Mike Needle